The local government areas of Scotland were redefined by the Local Government (Scotland) Act 1973 and redefined again by the Local Government etc (Scotland) Act 1994.

The 1973 Act created a system of nine two-tier regions and three islands areas, and this system completely replaced local government counties and burghs in 1975. The new regions were generally very different from the counties which had been in use since  the Local Government (Scotland) Act 1889. Also, the districts were very different from the subdivisions of counties, also called districts, which had been in use since the Local Government (Scotland) Act 1929.

Background
The reorganisation of local government in Scotland was a matter of political debate from the mid-1960s. In June 1963 the Scottish Office published a white paper titled The Modernization of Local Government in Scotland (Cmnd.2067). This proposed a large decrease in the number of local authorities in the country. There was to be a reduction from thirty-three county councils to between ten and fifteen. At the same time, new "second-tier councils" were proposed, with burghs being merged with the surrounding "landward" rural areas. The minimum population for the areas of these councils was to be 40,000. It was hoped that the reforms could be carried out quickly, with existing authorities agreeing to amalgamation and boundary alterations prior to legislation being passed. The white paper was rejected by the Association of Large Burghs, and by the Scottish Labour Party. At the 1964 general election Labour came to power, and the scheme was not pursued. Instead a royal commission under the chairmanship of Lord Wheatley was appointed in 1966 to enquire into local administration. Wheatley commented that "Our terms of reference are far-reaching: we have a free hand to recommend whatever arrangement of authorities, boundaries and functions seem likely to be right for a long time to come".

The commission's report was delivered on 25 September 1969, and recommended a two-tier system of 7 regions and 37 districts. The incoming Conservative government accepted the broad principles of the commission's report in their white paper Reform of Local Government in Scotland (Cmnd. 4583), published in February 1971. The number of regions was increased to 8, and of districts to 49. Also Orkney and Shetland were to become "most-purpose" authorities, separated from the Highland Region. Following consultation, the structure was modified.  The Western Isles, which was to have formed four districts of the Highland Region, became an islands area, with the same status as Orkney and Shetland. The number of districts was to remain at 49 in number, but with considerable boundary changes. These were the areas included in the Local Government (Scotland) Bill as introduced to parliament in 1973. Considerable changes were made during the passage of the legislation. Fife, which was to have been divided between the South-East and East Regions, was to become a region on the same boundaries as the existing county. This increased the number of regions to nine. The number of districts was increased to 53, numerous boundary changes were made and regions and districts renamed.

The first elections to the new district and regional councils were held on 7 May 1974, with the councillors sitting as "shadow authorities" until 16 May 1975 when they came into their powers.

Structure

Regions
Regions had a two-tier system of local government, with each region divided into districts, varying from 3 to 19 in number.

The top tier of local government was the regional council. Services provided at the regional level were those needing greater finance or resources, or best exercised over a wide area. These included police, fire services, consumer protection, education and transport.

Each district had an elected district council. In the case of Aberdeen, Dundee, Edinburgh and Glasgow, the districts had city status, although this did not confer any additional powers. District councils had responsibility for local services including local planning, housing, libraries and licensing.

Islands areas
The islands areas were unitary local government areas, exercising the powers of both a regional and district council.

Regions and islands areas 

Scotland was subdivided into regions and islands areas as follows:

Districts

Abolition
The 1994 Act created 29 new unitary local government areas, which completely replaced the regions and districts on 1 April 1996. The islands council areas continued in use and, therefore, Scotland now has 32 council areas.

See also
List of burghs in Scotland
Counties of Scotland
Lieutenancy areas of Scotland
Subdivisions of Scotland
List of places in Scotland
Local government in the United Kingdom

Notes and references

1973
.
Districts of Scotland
History of local government in Scotland
Scottish history-related lists